The Ecological Democratic Party (ÖDP) is a conservative and ecologist minor party in Germany. The ÖDP was founded in 1982.

The strongest level of voting support for the ÖDP is in Bavaria, where in federal state elections they have remained stable with 2% of the votes since 1990, and at municipal level have increased their mandate count in 2014 from 320 to around 380. After the 2019 European elections, the party was represented in the European Parliament by Klaus Buchner, who resigned in 2020. He was replaced in the European Parliament by Manuela Ripa. The ÖDP is a member of the World Ecological Parties.

History
The Ecological Democratic Party is a bourgeois ecology party that is active throughout Germany and has its clear focus in Bavaria.

The party's rise is closely linked to her founding father, the politician and environmentalist Herbert Gruhl. Gruhl was Member of the Bundestag from 1969 to 1980 and member of CDU. The founding of ÖDP dates back on the ecological movement in the 1970s. Gruhl gained attention by publishing a best-seller in 1975: "Ein Planet wird geplündert" (A Planet is Being Plundered). In the book he criticized the growth-oriented economy of industrial society. He also attacked nuclear energy policy and thus represented a clear minority position among Christian Democrats, while an intensive discussion was already developing in the SPD about a possible nuclear phase-out. Gruhl left the CDU in 1978 but stayed as non-partisan member of the Bundestag until 1980. He founded the "Grüne Aktion Zukunft" (GAZ), which later became part of The Greens. Gruhl lost the election for the party chairmen. Gruhl had a more conservative consistent life ethic ("Lebensschutzkonzeption"), which addresses besides environmentalism also the rejection of abortion, euthanasia and the death penalty. Also his policy was referred as ethno-centric. Gruhl left the Greens and, in 1982, founded the ÖDP.

Some commentators have said that the party has moved over the years in a more liberal direction regarding some issues since the mid-2000s. In many issues it emphasizes, such as the environment and trade, it is similar to the Alliance '90/The Greens. It differs from them by being less supportive of immigration and restrictions on state powers in criminal justice issues, not focusing on gay and lesbian rights as part of its platform, and having a differing view of feminism.

It was one of the earliest supporters (since 1989) of a green tax shift, an idea which later gained broader support and has been partially implemented in Germany since the Social Democratic Party and The Greens were elected to form the Federal government in 1998.

Though a very small party – it has not gained seats in a state parliament or in the Bundestag – the ÖDP became notable for its involvement in the opposition to a Czech nuclear reactor in Temelin, across the border from Bavaria. It led an initiative for a popular referendum to abolish the Bavarian Senate (that state's upper house) which was successful. It brought suit against a law in North Rhine-Westphalia which requires parties to receive 5% of the vote in order to take their seats in local councils, as well as a national law which reserves state financing only for parties that got more than one percent of the vote in at least three state elections; both laws were overturned.

The party has a youth organization called Young Ecologists (Junge Ökologen).

In the 2014 European parliament elections, the ÖDP received 0.7% of the national vote (185,119 votes in total) and returned a single MEP. The MEP, Klaus Buchner, joined The Greens–European Free Alliance (Greens/EFA) parliamentary group.

Controversy
On 17 December 2014, a single member of the Memmingen/Unterallgäu chapter of the ÖDP said at a meeting, that the proposed gender mainstreaming law was a "state license to corrupt children" and would give LGBT individuals "too much influence over a passive majority", and that LGBT individuals should not be allowed to marry. Party secretary Pablo Ziller said that the party's federal board was "disappointed" at the remarks and that the statements did not represent the party's position. According to Ziller, the party believes in extending marriage rights to same-sex couples.

Leaders

The current leader of the party is Charlotte Schmid. She succeeded Christian Rechholz in October 2022.

Election results

German Parliament (Bundestag)

European Parliament

State Parliaments (Landtage)
The following table shows the results of the most recent state elections the party contested:

References

External links

 (in German)
Basic Program of the ödp Ecological Democratic Party (in English)

 
Conservative parties in Germany
Green conservative parties
Green political parties in Germany
Political parties established in 1982
Parties represented in the European Parliament
Social conservative parties
1982 establishments in Germany